Kevin Christopher Newsom (born September 22, 1972) is an American attorney and jurist serving as a United States circuit judge of the United States Court of Appeals for the Eleventh Circuit.

Early life and education 
Kevin Newsom was born in Birmingham, Alabama, to Susan and Michael Alan Newsom, an attorney. Newsom attended Homewood High School in Birmingham. In 1994, Newsom received a Bachelor of Arts, summa cum laude, from Samford University, graduating first in his class. In 1997, he graduated from Harvard Law School with a Juris Doctor, magna cum laude, where he was Articles Editor of the Harvard Law Review.

Career 
After graduation, Newsom served as a law clerk to Judge Diarmuid O'Scannlain of the United States Court of Appeals for the Ninth Circuit. He then clerked for Justice David Souter of the Supreme Court of the United States from 1998 to 1999.

Between and after his clerkships, he worked for Covington & Burling in Washington, D.C. In December 2003, he was appointed the State of Alabama's second Solicitor General, replacing Nathan A. Forrester, and served for three and a half years under state Attorneys General William H. Pryor Jr. and Troy King. While serving as Solicitor General, Newsom argued 18 cases, including 3 before the United States Supreme Court. Afterwards, Newsom was a partner at Bradley Arant Boult Cummings LLP in Birmingham, where his practice focused on appellate litigation.

Newsom serves on the Board of Overseers of Samford University. He is a member of the Federalist Society and the American Law Institute.

Federal judicial service 
On May 8, 2017, President Donald Trump nominated Newsom to a seat on the United States Court of Appeals for the Eleventh Circuit vacated by Judge Joel F. Dubina, who assumed senior status on October 26, 2013. A hearing on his nomination before the Senate Judiciary Committee took place on June 14, 2017. On July 13, 2017, his nomination was reported out of committee by a 18–2 vote. On July 31, 2017, the United States Senate invoked cloture on his nomination by a 68–26 vote. On August 1, 2017, his nomination was confirmed by a 66–31 vote. He received his judicial commission on August 2, 2017.

Personal life 
In 1994, Newsom married Deborah E. Wilgus, who also attended Samford University, and they have two children.

See also 

 List of law clerks of the Supreme Court of the United States (Seat 3)
 Donald Trump Supreme Court candidates

References

Selected works

External links 
 
 Biography at Eleventh Circuit Court of Appeals
 
 Appearances at the U.S. Supreme Court from the Oyez Project
 
 Questionnaire for Judicial Nominees for the United States Senate Committee on the Judiciary	
 Contributor profile from the Federalist Society

|-

1972 births
Living people
20th-century American lawyers
21st-century American lawyers
21st-century American judges
Alabama lawyers
Alabama Republicans
American legal scholars
Federalist Society members
Harvard Law School alumni
Judges of the United States Court of Appeals for the Eleventh Circuit
Law clerks of the Supreme Court of the United States
Lawyers from Birmingham, Alabama
Lawyers from Washington, D.C.
Members of the American Law Institute
People associated with Covington & Burling
Samford University alumni
Solicitors General of Alabama
United States court of appeals judges appointed by Donald Trump